James A. Hoch is a microbiologist who is the head of the Division of Cellular Biology in the Department of Molecular and Experimental Medicine at the Scripps Research Institute. In the last 40 years his work has focused on dissecting the signal transduction mechanism that controls sporulation in Bacillus subtilis. He introduced the widely used phrase 'phosphorelay' to describe the transfer of phosphoryl groups between the two proteins involved in bacterial signal transduction that comprise the so-called two-component system.

References

Scripps Research faculty
Living people
Year of birth missing (living people)
Fellows of the American Academy of Microbiology